All Things Work Together is the eighth studio album by American Christian hip hop artist Lecrae, released on September 22, 2017, through Reach Records and Columbia Records, also making it his first major label release. The album features appearances from Tori Kelly, Ty Dolla Sign, 1K Phew, Kierra Sheard, Taylor Hill, Aha Gazelle, Jawan Harris and Verse Simmonds.

Background
All Things Work Together follows to Lecrae's 2016 mixtape Church Clothes 3 and 2014 studio album Anomaly.

In December 2016, Lecrae confirmed that a new album was in the works for 2017 in an interview with Rapzilla. He kept details of the features under wraps, saying he's been in the studio with "a lot of people", but did however confirm Tori Kelly was featured.

Upon his signing with Columbia Records, Lecrae worked with producers such as Boi-1da, T-Minus, Pluss, Dem Jointz, REO, Go Grizzly, Ayo the Producer, Swoope and DJ Frank E.

The album title, All Things Work Together is a biblical reference to Romans 8:28.

In an interview with Billboard, Lecrae explained the message of the album and the creative process by saying: "This was a hard project for me. It took a long time. I recorded about 60-70 records, and these 14 are the ones that stuck. It was a lot of emotional stuff, and we we're like, 'We need to find some light in the midst of all these songs,' because they sounded so dark......I hope that they understand there is hope in the chaos. I hope that they get that God loves them and there is nothing they can do about it – it's an unrelenting pursuit of you – and I want people to feel that. I want people to feel that they can make it."

Promotion
On October 21, 2016, Lecrae released the album's lead single "Can't Stop Me Now (Destination)". On January 21, 2017, he released the second single "Blessings" featuring Ty Dolla Sign. In June 2017, Lecrae released "I'll Find You" as the featuring Tori Kelly as the third single and "Hammer Time" featuring 1K Phew as a promotional single. On August 8, 2017, Lecrae announced the title of the album, All Things Work Together.

Concerts and touring
On August 3, 2017, Lecrae was a guest on Nick Cannon's Wild 'n Out, where he also performed "Blessings".

On August 8, 2017, Lecrae announced the All Things Work Together tour along with the album title. The Tour will be starting on October 4 running through December 5, stopping through 24 cities throughout North America.

On September 22, 2017, Lecrae performed "I'll Find You" with Tori Kelly on ABC's Good Morning America.

On December 21, 2017, Lecrae performed "Broke" on BET's The Rundown With Robin Thede.

In January 2018, a second leg of the All Things Work Together tour was announced, running from February to June in the United States, Europe and Africa.

Critical reception

Writing for Jesus Freak Hideout, David Craft awarded the album three out of five stars, lamenting that "the album is not as subversive as it thinks, and much of its construct seems to rely on [that] meretricious assumption," and concludes by noting that "All Things Work Together is a middle-of-the-road album." Also writing for Jesus Freak Hideout, Kevin Hoskins had a more favorable opinion, and in his four star review, stated that "throughout All Things Works Together, the production is hot, Crae spits fire, and most tracks are worthy to be on any Reach release."
Aaron McKrell of HipHopDX described the album as "Lecrae at his rawest". He praised the content of the album by saying "......is the culmination of Lecrae’s unapologetic faith combined with his ambition to spread his message through Hip Hop. His naked honesty and knack for conveying relatable emotions make the album one of his best projects to date."

Commercial performance
All Things Work Together debuted at number 11 on the Billboard 200 selling 29,227 equivalent copies (20,322 in pure album sales). It also charted at number 1 on the Christian Albums Chart and number 6 on the Rap Albums chart.

Track listing
Credits adapted from the album's liner notes.

Notes
  signifies a co-producer
  signifies an additional producer

Sample credits
 "Can't Stop Me Now (Destination)" contains elements from "Djohariah", written and performed by Sufjan Stevens
 "8:28" contains elements from "Indecision", written and performed by Sampha.

Personnel

 1K Phew – featured artist
 Aha Gazelle – featured artist
 Alex Medina – producer
 Ayo the Producer – producer
 Boi-1da – additional production
 Childish Major – vocals
 Colin Leonard – mastering engineer
 Danny Majic – producer
 Dem Jointz – producer
 DJ Dahi – producer, sleigh bells
 DJ Frank E – producer
 DJ Khalil – producer
 Don Clark –  art direction, graphic design
 Ekemini Uwan – additional vocals
 Fernando Cuellar – assistant engineer
 Go Grizzly – producer
 J Stevenson – recording engineer
 J-Hill – producer, electric guitar
 Jacob "Biz" Morris – recording engineer, mixing engineer
 Jason Romero – assistant engineer
 Jawan Harris – featured artist
 Jeremy Stevenson – A&R
 John Horesco IV – mastering engineer
 Jonathan Azu – A&R
 Joshua Kissi – photography
 Keyzbaby – producer, keyboards
 Kiarra Sheard – featured artist
 Koen Heldens – mixing engineer
 Manny Marroquin - mixing engineer
 Scott Desmarais - mixing engineer
 Robin Florent - mixing engineer
 Miles Walker - mixing engineer  
 Lecrae – primary artist
 Lewis Sky – additional vocals
 Metro Boomin – producer
 Natalie Lauren – A&R
 Nija – featured artist, additional vocals
 Nikhil "Kromatik" Seetharam – co-producer
 No I.D. – producer, bass guitar
 Perfekt – vocals
 PLUSS – producer
 Ramon "REO" Owen – producer
 Ryan Jumper – assistant engineer
 Swoope – producer, keyboards
 T-Minus – producer
 Tane Runo – producer
 Tariq Beats – producer
 Taylor Hill – producer, featured artist, keyboards
 The Futuristiks – producer
 Tony Evans – additional vocals
 Ty Dolla $ign – featured artist
 Verse Simmonds – featured artist
 Wordsplayed – producer
 Zach Paradis – recording engineer
 Devvon Terrell – recording engineer

Charts

References

Lecrae albums
2017 albums
Reach Records albums
Columbia Records albums
Albums produced by Boi-1da
Albums produced by DJ Dahi
Albums produced by DJ Frank E
Albums produced by DJ Khalil
Albums produced by Metro Boomin
Albums produced by No I.D.
Albums produced by T-Minus (record producer)